Camonea is a genus of flowering plants belonging to the family Convolvulaceae.

Its native range is Tropics and Subtropics.

Species:

Camonea bambusetorum 
Camonea kingii 
Camonea pilosa 
Camonea umbellata 
Camonea vitifolia

References

Convolvulaceae
Convolvulaceae genera